The Philadelphia Athletics were a professional baseball team that existed for two seasons from  to . After the demise of the PL following the 1890 season, the team joined the American Association (AA) for the 1891 season, and were managed by Bill Sharsig and George Wood. For each season, the franchise used Forepaugh Park as their home field.

Despite the existence of established major league representation in Philadelphia, the Phillies of the National League (NL) and the Athletics of the AA, the new PL franchise was able to sign veteran players, including Buffinton, Billy Shindle, George Wood, and Ben Sanders.  The Quakers finished the season with a 68–63 win–loss record, with one tie, placing them fifth among the eight PL teams.

Following the 1890 season, many players returned to their previous teams; however, the Athletics were able to sign quality veteran players, including Gus Weyhing, Elton Chamberlain, and Pop Corkhill.  The team completed the season with a 73–66 win–loss record, with four ties, placing them fifth among nine teams.  Following the 1891 season, the AA could no longer operate because of great financial losses, and was forced to fold; four of its teams became part of the NL, and the others, including the Athletics, accepted buyouts.  George Wood led the franchise in many batting categories, including; batting average with .299, at bats with 1067, hits with 319, and runs scored with 220.  Jocko Milligan's 44 doubles and 14 home runs led the franchise, while Weyhing's 31 wins in 1891 is tops among the pitching leaders, as well as his 3.18 earned run average.

Keys

Players

References
General
Lewis, Ethan (2001). "A Structure To Last Forever:The Players' League And The Brotherhood War of 1890". 
Specific

External links
Franchise index at Baseball-Reference and Retrosheet

Major League Baseball all-time rosters